Kuttemperoor River is a 12 km long revived river which acts as a tributary of both the Pamba and the Achankovil rivers in the Indian state of Kerala. It forms a link between the two rivers.The river has its northern end in the Pamba and the southern end in the Achenkovil river. It flows through the towns of Parumala, Budhanoor and Ennakkad. When the water level at the Pamba is higher it flows from Pamba to Achankovil and when the Achenkovil river has a higher water level it flows from Achankovil to Pamba.

References

Rivers of Alappuzha district
Pamba River